Thomas Telfair (March 2, 1780 – February 18, 1818) was a United States representative from Georgia. Born in Savannah, the third of four sons of Governor Edward Telfair, he graduated from the College of New Jersey in 1805. He went on to study law in Connecticut, was admitted to the bar, and commenced practice in Savannah.

Telfair was elected as a Democratic-Republican to the 13th and 14th  United States Congresses, serving from March 4, 1813, to March 3, 1817. He died in February 1818 at the age of thirty-one.

Like his father's before him, Thomas Telfair's remains were likely interred at the family's plantation and moved, many years later, to Savannah's Evergreen Cemetery.  The cemetery was established in 1846; in the 20th century its name was changed to Bonaventure, for the original plantation on the site.

References

External links
Telfair Family in the New Georgia Encyclopedia

1780 births
1818 deaths
Politicians from Savannah, Georgia
American people of Scottish descent
Princeton University alumni
Burials in Georgia (U.S. state)
Democratic-Republican Party members of the United States House of Representatives from Georgia (U.S. state)
19th-century American politicians